178 (one hundred [and] seventy-eight) is the natural number following 177 and preceding 179.

In mathematics

There are 178 biconnected graphs with six vertices, among which one is designated as the root and the rest are unlabeled. There are also 178 median graphs on nine vertices.

178 is one of the indexes of the smallest triple of dodecahedral numbers where one is the sum of the other two: the sum of the 46th and the 178th dodecahedral numbers is the 179th.

See also
 The year 178 AD or 178 BC
 List of highways numbered 178

References

Integers